Anahamulina is an extinct ammonoid cephalopod genus from the Lower Cretaceous. Named by Hyatt, 1900.

Description 
Anahamulina is characterized by an increasingly wide shaft that bends sharply to the opposite direction, at some point ending in a shorter terminal section. The two sections are not in lateral contact. The first, and earlier, shaft has fine, dense, oblique ribs, which in the second, and later, shaft are stronger and more radial.

Two species are recognized.  The type Anahamulina subcylindrica, named by Hyatt, 1900, is based on Hamulina subcylindrica d'Orbigny 1850.

Distribution 
It is found in Europe and Japan. Anahamulina wilcoxensis named by Imlay, 1960, is known from California and Oregon.

References

External links
Arkell et al., 1957. Mesozoic Ammonoidea (L215); Treatise on Invertebrate Paleontology Part L Ammonoidea. Geological Soc. of America and Univ Kansas Press

 
 

Early Cretaceous ammonites of North America
Ammonitida genera
Ancyloceratoidea